= Mating ritual =

Mating rituals may refer to:

- Mating, procreative behavior in animals
- Courtship display, animal behaviors involving mating rituals
